Upalite (Al(UO2)3(PO4)2O(OH)·7H2O) is a mineral found in the Democratic Republic of Congo. It is named after uranium, phosphorus and aluminium. Its type locality is Kobokobo pegmatite, Mwenga, Sud-Kivu, Democratic Republic of Congo.

References 

Aluminium minerals
Uranium(VI) minerals
Phosphate minerals
Monoclinic minerals
Minerals in space group 14